Cromwell is an 1820 verse tragedy by Honoré de Balzac. It was Balzac's first work as an author, when he decided to quit his career as a solicitor to become an independent writer. That decision displeased his mother, who agreed to give him the bare minimum of money to live on his own, in order to discourage him to follow the path of literature. When the tragedy was finished, it was reviewed by a professor named Andrieux, the former tutor of Eugène de Surville, Balzac's step brother. On the manuscript, Andrieux wrote: "The author should do anything he likes, but not literature."

Notes

Bibliography

 Robb, Graham (1994). Balzac: A Biography. New York: W. W. Norton & Company. .
 
1835 books
French plays
Works by Honoré de Balzac